The Men's decathlon at the 2010 Commonwealth Games as part of the athletics programme was held at the Jawaharlal Nehru Stadium on Thursday 7 and Friday 8 October 2010.

Records

Results

External links
2010 Commonwealth Games - Athletics

Men's decathlon
2010